Worcester Lunch Car Company was a manufacturer of diners based in Worcester, Massachusetts, from 1906 to 1957.

History

In 1906 Philip H. Duprey and Grenville Stoddard established the Worcester Lunch Car and Carriage Manufacturing Company, which shipped 'diners' all over the Eastern Seaboard. It was named for Worcester, Massachusetts, where the company was based. The first manufactured lunch wagons with seating appeared throughout the Northeastern US in the late 19th century, serving busy downtown locations without the need to buy expensive real estate. It is generally accepted that the name "diner" as opposed to "lunch wagon" was not widely used before 1925. The company produced  651 diners between 1906 and 1957, when manufacturing ceased. All of Worcester Lunch Car's assets were auctioned in 1961.

Examples

Many diners still exist in the Worcester area, including Casey's Diner (1922) in nearby Natick and the Boulevard Diner (1936) in Worcester, which are some of the oldest diners in the country and listed on the National Register of Historic Places.

The Miss Worcester Diner (1948) still exists in its original location across the street from the former factory. The Rosebud (1941) is an example at 381 Summer Street in Somerville, Massachusetts near Davis Square. The Elmwood Diner (originally known as Central Diner) is Worcester Lunch Car Company #806 built in 1947 and moved to its current location in 1953 where is still operates in the Elmwood section of Providence, Rhode Island. It was added to the National Register of Historic Places in 2010  
Worcester Lunch Car Company #821 is still in its original location at 53 Park Street in Adams, Massachusetts. The former "Miss Adams diner" was sold to a couple in 2013 who operate it as, Izzy's Diner and Pizza,  a full service diner and pizza shop, and still contains many original items including the original Worcester Lunch Car Clock. The car is slowly being restored to look as it did originally. In August 2020, the diner was purchased by a local restaurateur. 

While most of their diners were located in New England some were purchased as far away as Florida.  The Henry Ford Museum in Michigan contains a notable example of a Worcester Lunch Car diner called Lamy's, built in 1946. In January 2012, Lamy's once again began serving food. Many surviving Worcester Lunch Car diners are currently listed on the National Register of Historic Places.

Other examples

Maine
 A-1 Diner, Gardiner, Maine
Miss Portland Diner – WLCC No. 818, 1949

Massachusetts
 Lloyd's Diner, 184 Fountain St, Framingham, Massachusetts
 Blue Point Restaurant, 6 Dayton Street, Acushnet, Massachusetts
 Club Diner, Dutton Street, Lowell, Massachusetts
 Owl Diner, Appleton Street, Lowell, Massachusetts
 Day and Night Diner, Route 20,  Palmer, Massachusetts (Worcester Lunch Car #781, 1944)

 Dinky’s Blue Belle Diner, Shrewsbury, Massachusetts (Worcester Lunch Car #814)
 Lanna Thai Diner, Woburn, Massachusetts
 Miss Adams Diner Adams, Massachusetts; Worcester Lunch Car 821

New Hampshire

 4 Aces Diner, Bridge St, West Lebanon, New Hampshire
Daddypops Tumble Inn Diner, Main Street, Claremont NH
Gilleys Diner (1940), Portsmouth, NH
Peterborough Diner (1950s), Peterborough, NH

New York
 Bolton Beans, Lake Shore Drive, Bolton Landing, New York. Originally Mancini’s in Providence, Rhode Island. In 1961 became Don’s Diner in Plainville, Massachusetts. In 1969 moved to North Attleboro, Massachusetts as Red Rock Hill Diner. In 1989 moved to Bolton Landing as Bolton Beans.

Rhode Island

 Jigger’s Hill and Harbour Diner, Main Street, East Greenwich, Rhode Island
 Miss Lorraine Diner, Mineral Spring Avenue, Pawtucket (Worcester Lunch Car No. 774), formerly Donwell's Diner in Hartford, CT

Vermont
 Athens Diner, formerly Libby's Blue Line Diner, originally The Casu Diner in Turner's Falls, Mass. (Worcester Lunch Car #838, 1953)
 Chelsea Royal Diner, West Brattleboro, Vermont
 Parkway Diner, South Burlington, Vermont
 Miss Bellows Falls Diner, Bellows Falls, Vermont (Worcester Lunch Car #771, 1941)

See also
List of diners
Jerry O'Mahony Diner Company
Wilson's Diner

References

External links
Gutman's The Worcester Lunch Car Company
Liberty Elm Diner

1906 establishments in the United States
Diner manufacturers